Bergen's Electric Tramway is an organization which operates a museum tramway in Møhlenpris in Bergen, Norway. The tramway is an attempt at a revival of the Bergen Tramway, which operated from 1897–1965.

The tramway is based at Bergen Technical Museum. This building has recently been awarded heritage status and a large sum of money has been spent on renovations on the roof.

Although the line is currently only 300 m long, an expansion to Den Nationale Scene is under construction. Further, more ambitious plans include lines to Bryggen and St Mary's Church, Nordnes and Bergen Aquarium, and VilVite.

References

External links

 

1993 establishments in Norway
Heritage railways in Norway
Museums established in 1993
Museums in Bergen
Organisations based in Bergen
Tram transport in Bergen

no:Trikken i Bergen#Museumslinje